Thomas N. Smith  (1851 – March 28, 1889) was an American professional baseball player who played second base for the 1875 Brooklyn Atlantics.

External links

1851 births
1889 deaths
19th-century baseball players
Baseball people from Ontario
Brooklyn Atlantics players
Canadian expatriate baseball players in the United States
Major League Baseball players from Canada
Major League Baseball second basemen
Sportspeople from Guelph
Guelph Maple Leafs players
London Tecumseh players
Syracuse Stars (minor league baseball) players
19th-century deaths from tuberculosis
Tuberculosis deaths in Michigan